The 1930 season was the Hawthorn Football Club's 6th season in the Victorian Football League and 29th overall.

Fixture

Premiership Season

Ladder

References

Hawthorn Football Club seasons